Grigory Kotovsky (1881–1925) was a Soviet military leader.

Kotovsky (masculine), Kotovskaya (feminine) or Kotovskoye (neuter) may also refer to:

 Kotovsky District, a district of Volgograd Oblast in Russia
 Kotovsky (rural locality) (Kotovskaya, Kotovskoye), several rural localities in Russia
 Kotovsky (film), a 1942 Soviet film

See also
 Kotowski (disambiguation)
 Kotovsk (disambiguation)
 Kotov (disambiguation)
 Kotovo